Jeney is a surname. Notable people with the surname include:

 László Jeney (1923–2006), Hungarian water polo player
 Mihály Lajos Jeney (1723/1724–1797), Hungarian general and mapmaker
 Viktor de Jeney (1902–1996), Hungarian painter
 Zoltán Jeney (born 1943), Hungarian composer

Hungarian-language surnames